Raymond Wolff is a St. Maartener international footballer who plays as a midfielder for RISC Takers FC of the Sint Maarten Futsal League, and Sint Maarten.

Club career
Wolff has played for RCS, Sparta, VV GOES, HSV Hoek, and VC Vlissingen in his native Netherlands. He played for VC Vlissingen until 2010. In March of that year, became the first player on the team to score two goals in a single match during that season. He appeared in a KNVB Cup match against RKVV EVV ECHT while with Hoek in 2011. The match ended in a 3–5 defeat. He played for HSV Hoek between 2011 and 2013 until he joined VV GOES.

Wolff returned to VC Vlissingen in 2014. During Wolff's final season with the club, he sustained a groin injury in a Cup loss to his former club HSV Hoek, marking the final cup match he would play with Vlissingen. He played his final league match for the club on 11 June 2015 in a 1–3 defeat to HBS Craeyenhout. A victory would have seen the club promoted to the Topklasse, the third tier of Football in the Netherlands. While with Vlissingen, Wolff played as a striker.

After immigrating to Sint Maarten, he joined RISC Takers FC of the country's futsal league.

International career
Wolf first represented Sint Maarten internationally during the 2016 CFU Futsal Championship. He scored three goals in three matches as Sint Maarten finished third in its group. Two of his goals came in a 3–2 upset victory over Jamaica. The third goal was scored by Rick De Punder who immigrated to Sint Maarten along with Wolff.

Wolff made his international football debut for Sint Maarten in a friendly against Anguilla on 13 March 2016. The match was Sint Maarten's first senior international in over ten years and was played in preparation for each side's 2017 Caribbean Cup qualification campaigns which were set to begin the following week. Wolf made his competitive debut for Sint Maarten on 22 March 2016 in the team's first match against Grenada. He helped the team maintain a scoreless draw in the first half before being substituted after sustaining a broken rib.

International career statistics

Personal
In 2015, Wolff immigrated to Sint Maarten from the Netherlands to be with his girlfriend who had previously moved there.

References

External links
 Caribbean Football Database profile
 
 

1987 births
Living people
Sportspeople from Vlissingen
Dutch Antillean footballers
Association football midfielders
Sint Maarten international footballers
Footballers from Zeeland
Dutch footballers
VV Goes players